is a retired Japanese amateur boxer. He won a bronze medal at the 1974 Asian Games and competed at the 1976 Olympics, where he was eliminated in the first bout.

1976 Olympic results
Below is the record of Noboru Uchiyama, a Japanese light flyweight boxer who competed at the 1976 Montreal Olympics:

 Round of 32: lost to Brendan Dunne (Ireland) referee stopped contest in the second round

References

1954 births
Living people
Boxers at the 1976 Summer Olympics
Olympic boxers of Japan
Japanese male boxers
Medalists at the 1974 Asian Games
Asian Games bronze medalists for Japan
Boxers at the 1974 Asian Games
Asian Games medalists in boxing
Light-flyweight boxers